Pyrgotoides peruviana is a species of tephritid or fruit flies in the genus Pyrgotoides of the family Tephritidae.

Distribution
Peru.

References

Tephritinae
Insects described in 1976
Diptera of South America